Landfall Peak is a prominent peak-shaped landmark near the extreme west end of Thurston Island, Antarctica, about  east-northeast of Cape Flying Fish and 0.5 nautical miles (0.9 km) northwest of Mount Gimber. The peak was plotted from air photos taken by U.S. Navy Operation Highjump in December 1946, and was observed by personnel of the U.S. Navy Bellingshausen Sea Expedition in February 1960. It was so named by the Advisory Committee on Antarctic Names because rock exposures on the peak serve as a mark for ships approaching Thurston Island from the west.

See also
 Mountains in Antarctica

Maps
 Thurston Island – Jones Mountains. 1:500000 Antarctica Sketch Map. US Geological Survey, 1967.
 Antarctic Digital Database (ADD). Scale 1:250000 topographic map of Antarctica. Scientific Committee on Antarctic Research (SCAR). Since 1993, regularly upgraded and updated.

References

Mountains of Ellsworth Land
Thurston Island